Mistrial is the fourteenth solo studio album by American rock musician Lou Reed, released in June 1986 by RCA Records two years after his previous studio album, New Sensations (1984). Fernando Saunders and Reed produced the album.

Mistrial peaked at No. 47 on the U.S. Billboard 200 and at No. 69 on the UK Albums Chart. Two singles were released from the album: "The Original Wrapper" and "No Money Down" with the latter being the only single to chart, peaking at No. 75 on the ARIA Charts. A music video was created for "No Money Down" that featured an animatronic Lou Reed, and a music video was also created for "The Original Wrapper" which features time-lapse photography of New Yorkers on the street.

Panamanian singer Rubén Blades provided backing vocals on two tracks, "I Remember You" and "Tell It to Your Heart", while punk rock musician Jim Carroll sang backing vocals on one, "Video Violence".

Track listing

Personnel
Adapted from the Mistrial liner notes.

Musicians
 Lou Reed – vocals; Lead guitar,  rhythm guitar
 Fernando Saunders – rhythm guitar on "Tell It to Your Heart" and "Don't Hurt a Woman", bass guitar, synthesizer, programming, piano on "I Remember You", percussion on "Outside", backing vocals
 Eddie Martinez – rhythm guitar on "No Money Down", "Don't Hurt a Woman" and "The Original Wrapper"
 Rick Bell – tenor saxophone on "No Money Down"
 J.T. Lewis – drums on "Mistrial", "Don't Hurt a Woman" and "Tell It to Your Heart", percussion on "No Money Down"
 Sammy Merendino – programming on "Don't Hurt a Woman" and "Tell It to Your Heart", percussion on "No Money Down", "Video Violence" and "The Original Wrapper"
 Jim Carroll – backing vocals on "Video Violence"
 Rubén Blades – backing vocals on "I Remember You" and "Tell It to Your Heart"

Production and artwork
 Lou Reed – producer
 Fernando Saunders – producer 
 Bruce Lampcov – mixing
 Sylvia Reed – cover design

Charts

See also
 List of albums released in 1986
 Lou Reed's discography

References

External links
 

1986 albums
Lou Reed albums
RCA Records albums
Albums produced by Lou Reed